Prostitution in Vietnam is illegal and considered a serious crime. Nonetheless, Vietnam's Ministry of Labour, Invalids and Social Affairs (MOLISA) has estimated that there were 71,936 :prostitutes in the country in 2013. Other estimates puts the number at up to 200,000.

Sex workers organizations report that law enforcement is abusive and corrupt.

MOLISA reported that in 2011, 750 prostitutes and 300 pimps were arrested. 251 businesses had their business licenses revoked for involvement in the sex trade that year.

History

period 

It is unclear when prostitution and other forms of sex work first appeared in Vietnam. Possibly the earliest depiction or mention of female sex work in Vietnam is in The Tale of Kiều, an epic poem written c. 1800 by celebrated Vietnamese writer Nguyễn Du. To prevent the imprisonment of her brother and father, she sells herself into marriage, unaware that her new husband is a pimp, who forces her into sex work. Despite the poem's focus on forced sex work, it remains popular and moving even for present-day readers, suggesting that sex work is not strictly taboo in Vietnamese society.

The poem is set during the reign of the Jiajing Emperor of Ming China, at a time when  was politically independent from China but asserted its membership in a shared, Confucian cultural world alongside China. Unsurprisingly, the poem depicts a form of sex work that resembles Chinese courtesan culture. The protagonist, Kiều, is not just a provider of sexual services but also an entertainer, a performer, and a potential lover. The poem reveals a 19th century understanding of sex work in Vietnam that is rooted in performative and affective, not just sexual, labor. Its continued resonance suggests that this understanding of sex work persists in the present.

This lacuna suggests that even if sex work was present, it was treated ambiguously by  rulers. To illustrate, the 1812 legal code promulgated by Emperor Gia Long of the Nguyễn dynasty, the most well-known of pre-colonial legal documents from Vietnam, does not contain any explicit prohibition of sex work, but it does contain a provision for punishing male court officials who visit  singing houses, which have a reputation as historic sites of female sex work coupled with courtly entertainment.

Colonial period

Overview 

During the colonial period, female prostitution and other forms of sex work were not banned but instead heavily regulated by French authorities. The regulations focused heavily on encounters between the colonizing and the colonized (i.e., European men and Vietnamese women) leaving other kinds of sexual encounters and other forms of sex work, including ones involving native men or European women, unregulated. Even then, there was plenty of clandestine or "black market" sex work that took place outside of the regulation system in the colonial period. This situation is akin to that of the pre-colonial period, when sex work was regulated, albeit more loosely, and clandestine sex work also took place outside of the  regulation system.

The regulation of female sex work did not exist in a vacuum. Instead, it was part of the colonial government's general system of regulating carnal encounters between the European and the Vietnamese populations. As anthropologist-historian Ann Laura Stoler observes, sex work came to be seen as increasingly permissible when concubinage began falling out of favor with the government in the early 20th century. Concubinage, both in Indochina and much of Southeast Asia, was initially seen in the late 19th century as more conducive than sex work for stabilizing racial hierarchies and preserving public health, because it provided European men in the colonies with an opportunity to build interracial relationships outside of marriage that are stable and do not risk the spread of venereal diseases. However, concubinage produced mixed-race progeny whose identities were seen, increasingly in the early 20th century, as threatening to blur the boundary between colonizer and colonized and, thus, undermine racial hierarchies. In that context, another historian notes that to colonial authorities, sex work became permissible or even preferable to concubinage, because it was seen as a loveless transaction; as such, it was highly regulated but not prohibited outright.

Both colonial records and contemporary native reportages tend to frame female sex work in colonial Vietnam as a problem that was not only morally and medically improper but was also a microcosm of some larger problem or fear, whether it had to do with the ineffectiveness of French colonial governance or the decline of Vietnamese society. The work was originally published in a local newspaper in a serialized format, before it was published as a book later in 1937.

’s detailed study of the sex industry was only possible because Hanoi's officials wanted to showcase the city's ostensible success in dealing with sex work to journalists and writers like , which give him and his contemporaries unprecedented access in 1937 to the municipal dispensary where sex workers were treated for venereal diseases. However, sex work was by no means hidden from public view at the time, nor was the  ’s first foray into writing about sex work, as he had just published a novel in 1936 with a fictionalized account of how an upper-class woman becomes a sex worker, written in the style of social realism. ’s view is not simply that sex work was immoral, but that the outsize presence of sex work in Hanoi was a symptom of larger problems—such as exploitative or ineffectual colonial policies, materialistic attitudes, poverty, and the spread of venereal diseases—which stood in stark contrast to French claims that Vietnam was prospering under colonial rule.

On the other hand, the academic scholarship on the colonial period generally presents a view of female sex work as more than just an object of colonial regulation in the name of dealing with moral or medical impropriety, but also as an indication of the sex workers’ agency and a metaphor for the gendered and racial hierarchies that are at the heart of the colonial enterprise. Many sex workers chose this line of work because they wished to escape rural poverty, and the sex industry provided a viable professional opportunity for them to uplift themselves economically. This sense of agency also compelled sex workers to ply their trade in the black market, outside of onerous regulatory requirements and the state's taxation regime. At the same time, sex workers did not always make the choice of entering the profession freely; they might have turned to sex work out of sheer economic desperation or fallen victim to indenture or trafficking schemes. The fact that sex work was even a viable pursuit at all—that Vietnamese female sex workers would be patronized by European men—also had to do with the gendered and racial order in place at the time, which frequently cast Vietnamese women, in literary, visual, and epistolary depictions, as sexual objects for the European male gaze and desire.

Regulations 
In general, historians have observed that regulations pertaining to sex work in colonial Indochina frequently echoed and influenced similar regulations in France, as described and analyzed by French historian Alain Corbin.

Tonkin 

Shortly after the establishment of Tonkin as a French protectorate, in 1888, the Hanoi Municipal Council put in place formal regulations on prostitution in the city. (Similar regulations had also been introduced in Haiphong in 1886.) The 1888 regulations include a provision for the official licensing of brothel houses; these licensed brothels were the only places where sex work was permitted. At the same time, sex workers had to register their names, ages, places of origin, and place of employment with the municipal police, who maintained an official register of sex workers. In addition, the regulations expressly forbid the act of procuring, and dictate that only a woman could be the proprietor of a brothel.

The Hanoi regulations were not set in stone: A modified set of rules, promulgated in 1891, permit independent sex workers to be licensed to work at a location of their own choosing rather than only at a licensed brothel. Eventually, an extensive, uniform law governing sex work in all of Tonkin was promulgated by the protectorate's  (resident superior) in 1921. Besides instituting requirements for registration and regular health checks, and mandatory treatment if a venereal infection were to be discovered, the 1921 law also taxes sex workers’ incomes.

The 1921 law, though ostensibly uniformly applied throughout Tonkin, was, strictly speaking, in force only in the French concessions—the cities of Hanoi and Haiphong, provincial capitals, and military bases—because the rest of the protectorate was indirectly ruled by the French through the Vietnamese emperor of the  dynasty (Emperor Khải Định at the time). (It has also been suggested that the special attention paid to military bases reveals that protecting the health of soldiers in the colonies was a key objective for regulating sex work and preventing the spread of venereal diseases in Tonkin.) This patchwork legal situation created many spaces of non-regulation that sex workers would flock to if they did not wish to submit themselves to a regulatory system that they deemed onerous and oppressive, thus creating a thriving black market for clandestine sex work in Tonkin in the interwar years. The presence of this black market was something that colonial officials frequently worried about, owing to fears about the possibility, in their minds, of an uncontrolled spread of venereal diseases among the buyers and sellers of clandestine, unregulated sex.

Cochinchina 
Much less research has been done on the history of sex work during the colonial period in central and south Vietnam, compared to north Vietnam (Tonkin). Whatever details that have been uncovered by historians about the regulation of sex work in Cochinchina suggests great similarity with the situation in Tonkin. There exist provisions in an 1878 ordinance for the regulation of licensed brothel houses, the registration of sex workers either as attached to specific brothels or as independent , and regular checks for venereal diseases at the municipal dispensary, especially in Saigon and Chợ Lớn (which would merge with Saigon to form a single city in 1931).

According to police and court records from the Cochinchinese archives, proprietors of brothel houses, as well as sex workers themselves, were given short prison sentences of 15 to over 30 days for violating any of the regulations concerning the registration or regular medical inspection of sex workers. In particular, clandestine sex workers—who refused to be subjected to registration and medical requirements—were targeted for harsh enforcement, due to the colonial government's public health fears about them spreading venereal diseases, both amongst themselves and to their European male clients.

Foreign sex workers 

Besides native Vietnamese women, the sex industry in colonial Vietnam also saw the participation of sex workers of other nationalities, including Chinese, Korean, and Japanese. Japanese women who traveled to other places to become sex workers are known as karayuki-san. In Vietnam, the French word  was used to refer to Japanese sex workers more specifically as well as all Japanese women more generally, which suggests either that most Japanese women in Vietnam at the time were sex workers or that Japanese women were always seen by the French in highly sexualized terms. Perspectives on Japanese women in Vietnam at the time were also possibly affected by the 1887 publication of Pierre Loti's novel, Madame Chrysanthème, which has as one of its main characters a  who marries a French naval officer stationed in Japan.

Japanese sex workers were present from early in the colonial period: records show that the first mention of a Japanese sex worker in Cochinchina dates to 1883, while in Haiphong, it dates to 1885. They were engaged in similar activities as their native peers, but they would typically offer their services in separate brothels and places of entertainment, or as independent workers. Unlike their Vietnamese peers, many Japanese sex workers would start off being under the yoke of indenture to cover the cost of their journey from Japan to Indochina. Officials saw the Japanese sex workers, in an Orientalizing manner, as allegories or representations of the Japanese nation or certain essentialized Japanese values. The colonial authorities did not seek to prohibit Japanese women from sex work, but merely subjected them to the same registration and medical regulations that applied to Vietnamese sex workers.

There was also a sizeable number of Chinese sex workers who were present in Vietnam at the time. Their clientele was likely more narrowly focused on the significant populations of Chinese men located throughout the Indochinese colonies then. Significantly, an attempt in 1903 by the Saigon authorities to subject places that house Chinese entertainers to the same regulations as all other brothels in the city did not go well, as the Chinese Chamber of commerce in Saigon intervened to argue that the new regulations were dehumanizing as well as to force the authorities to refrain from imposing new regulations.

Vietnam War period 
During the Vietnam War (American War in Vietnam), a whole sex industry sprung up around American servicemen. It has been estimated that there were 300,000 prostitutes in the entire country during this period. Prostitutes congregated at bars frequented by GIs, and by Vietnamese soldiers and citizens. They offered a variety of services. Sometimes, the prostitutes got pregnant. A number of Amerasian children were born as a result, who were ostracized and given the derisive name bui doi ('dust of life'). Often, these children were themselves forced into prostitution.

During the war, hooch maids would often clean up after the soldiers in their dwellings. One soldier described the maids as being, "...good Catholics who might flirt with you but would never date an American soldier." At the same time it was not unheard of for maids to "keep the plumbing clean" for soldiers to earn some extra income.

Legal situation
The "Ordinance on Prostitution Prevention and Combat" 2003 states:
Article 4: The following acts are strictly prohibited:
1. Buying sex;
2. Selling sex;
3. Harboring prostitution;
4. Organizing prostitution activities;
5. Forcing prostitution;
6. Brokering prostitution;
7. Protecting prostitution;
8. Abusing the service business for prostitution activities;
9. Other acts related to prostitution activities as prescribed by law.
Article 23.- Handling of prostitutes
1. Prostitutes shall, depending on the nature and seriousness of their violations, be administratively sanctioned, applied with the measure of education in communes, wards or townships or sent into medical treatment establishments. Foreign prostitutes shall, depending on the nature and seriousness of their violations, be administratively sanctioned in the forms of caution, fine and/or expulsion.
2. Prostitutes who, though being aware of their HIV infection, deliberately transmit the disease to other persons shall be examined for penal liability.
Article 24.- Handling of persons committing prostitution-related acts
1. Those who protect prostitution, contribute capital for use for prostitution purposes shall, depending on the nature and seriousness of their violations, be administratively sanctioned or examined for penal liability.
2. Those who act as go-between for prostitution, harbor prostitution, coerce prostitution, organize prostitution, traffic in women and/or children in service of prostitution activities shall be examined for penal liability.

Following complaints that Article 23.1 was in violation of the prostitute's rights, in June 2012 the "Law on Administrative Sanctions" ordered the release of all prostitutes and replaced "re-education" with fine between of the equivalent of $25 and $100. (About 1,300 prostitutes were in "rehabilitation’ centres" in July 2011 being "treated and re-educated’).

Calls for decriminalization
A survey of 150 prostitutes by the Vietnamese government-run "Institute of Labor Science and Social Affairs" found that 44 percent of prostitutes had suffered violence at the hands of clients. Just under a half did not report the crimes to the authorities. The "Vietnam Network of Sex Workers" have called for decriminalization to make sex work safer. Kimberly Kay Hoang, assistant professor of sociology at the University of Chicago, who conducted a 2011 study of prostitutes in Ho Chi Minh City is quoted as saying: "Legalising prostitution would also reduce violence and sex crimes such as rape and sexual violence. Prostitutes would feel safe calling the police to report instances of violence and abuse by clients, traffickers, and pimps to law enforcement officials." Mr. Le Duc Hien, deputy director of a government department tasked with fighting social evils under the labor ministry, crystallized this by telling the media: "It would be a strategic mistake to tap prostitution as an industry to boost tourism revenues. What would happen if we recognize sex work as a profession but fail to manage it later on?"

Terminology
Various groups and individuals in Vietnam, including sex worker activists, scholars, the media, and non-governmental organizations such as the Vietnam Network of Sex Workers (part of the Asia Pacific Network of Sex Workers), prefer using the term sex work instead of prostitution. The Vietnamese government still refers almost exclusively to prostitution and prostitutes as the targets of its policies, whether that is the criminalization or the potential legalization of sex work in the country. There is no clear or consistent pattern in how the terms are applied, even though there is an increasing awareness of other forms of sex work that so-called prostitutes may in fact be engaging in, such as webcam modeling. There is also a recognition that the term sex work may not fully encompass the problem of sex trafficking, which Vietnam continues to deal with, as the term implies that a certain level of agency and willingness to engage in sexual labor, which victims of sex trafficking have been denied. In discussing the historical phenomenon, some scholars argue that using the term sex work is anachronistic and prefer the term prostitution instead, as the latter term is what was used in documents and texts from the past. Conversely, other scholars argue that the phenomenon was just as diverse in the past as it is in the present, so the term sex work is perhaps more appropriate than the term prostitution as an all-encompassing reference, and certainly more aligned with the ways in which sex workers in the present prefer to be identified and discussed.

HIV

There is a problem of HIV among sex workers. Fear of detection prevents prostitutes accessing health services and so infections go untreated and spread. Advocates of decriminalization submit that where prostitution is illegal, sex workers are more susceptible to STIs.

At a conference it 2011, a paper presented by Vietnam's Labor Ministry, said 9.3% of prostitutes in the country were infected by HIV. However it was considerably higher is some areas: Hanoi 20%, Ho Chi Minh City 16%, and Hai Phong 23%. Lack of access to condoms and medical services were primary causes. Prostitutes may also avoid condoms as they can be used as evidence of prostitution.

A study of 5,298 prostitutes published in 2015 by "Drug Alcohol Depend" concluded that injected drug use is also a key risk factor for HIV transmission amongst prostitutes.

Vietnamese prostitution in other nations
Vietnamese prostitution is not confined to the country itself. In Ho Chi Minh City and the Mekong Delta, there are reports of women being forced into prostitution after marrying overseas, particularly in other Asian countries. In Macau, exploitation of women has been supported by legal organizations. In the end, these women were often forced into indentured servitude or prostitution. Many women travel from Lao Cai to Hekou County in China to work in brothels that cater to Chinese men.

Child trafficking
In Ho Chi Minh City, many of the prostitutes are under 18 years of age. Some forced into the trade because of economic needs. The prostitutes are both girls and boys (called Trai bao ("covered boy") and trai gọi ("call boy")). In addition, children are trafficked due to the demand for prostitution in other countries. One non-governmental organization estimates that the average age of trafficked girls is between 15 and 17, although the average age of girls trafficked to Cambodia is estimated to be much lower. In the Sa Pa tourist region, an Australian non-governmental organization uncovered 80 commercial cases of child exploitation by foreign nationals in 2007, the same year that the nation established a child sex tourism investigative unit within the Vietnam Ministry of Public Security.

Sex trafficking

Vietnam is listed as a Tier 2 country for human trafficking by the US Department of State Office to Monitor and Combat Trafficking in Persons.

Vietnam is a source and, to a lesser extent, a destination country for women, and children subjected to sex trafficking. Vietnamese women and children are subjected to sex trafficking abroad; many are misled by fraudulent employment opportunities and sold to brothel operators on the borders of China, Cambodia, and Laos, and elsewhere in Asia, including Thailand, Malaysia, Republic of Korea, Taiwan, and Singapore. Some Vietnamese women who travel abroad for internationally brokered marriages or jobs in restaurants, massage parlors, and karaoke bars
— mostly to China, Malaysia, and Singapore – are subjected to forced prostitution. False advertising, debt bondage, passport confiscation, and threats of deportation are tactics commonly used to compel Vietnamese victims into servitude. Traffickers increasingly use the internet, gaming sites, and particularly social media to lure potential victims into vulnerable situations; for example, men entice young women and girls with online dating relationships and persuade them to move abroad, then subject them to sex trafficking.

Many children from impoverished rural areas, and a rising number from middle class and urban settings, are subjected to sex trafficking. Child sex tourists, reportedly from elsewhere in Asia, the United Kingdom and other countries in Europe, Australia, Canada, and the United States, exploit children in Vietnam.

Portrayal in media

Miss Saigon

The protagonist of the 1989 musical Miss Saigon is a Vietnamese prostitute named Kim. Echoing the plot of Puccini's opera Madama Butterfly, Kim falls in love with and is left pregnant by a client who is a white American soldier with a wife at home. After he has abandoned her for his American wife, Kim realizes her child's father will never return and shoots herself. The show drew criticism for promoting the stereotype of a dominant/submissive relationship between a Western man and an Asian prostitute.

Fuck Miss Saigon
The 2017 book on the sex trade in Vietnam, written by a working prostitute from the Mekong Delta.  This is the first account of prostitution in Vietnam by a prostitute.

Âm Tính
The 2008 Vietnamese television series Âm Tính is a documentary about Lam Uyen Nhi, a former beauty contest winner turned prostitute and drug addict. Eventually, Lam died in 2007 after a battle with HIV/AIDS. The 20-part series focuses on Lam's ups and downs, with 2006 Miss Vietnam winner Mai Phuong Thuy playing the role of Lam.

Full Metal Jacket
The 1987 film Full Metal Jacket features scenes wherein prostitution is depicted with the soldiers. In one scene, Private Joker (Matthew Modine) and Private Rafterman (Kevyn Major Howard) are approached by a Da Nang hooker (Papillon Soo Soo). One of the scenes occurs during a lull between battles:

Da Nang Hooker: Well, baby, me so horny. Me so horny. Me love you long time. Me sucky sucky.

[later in the same dialog exchange]
Private Joker: What can I get for ten dollars?
Da Nang Hooker: Every t'ing you want.
Private Joker: Everything?
Da Nang Hooker: Every t'ing.

Hearts and Minds 
The 1974 film Hearts and Minds features scenes of prostitution, at both the beginning of the film, and during the middle of it. The first scene depicts soldiers' soliciting prostitutes in Saigon, and the second scene includes interviews with soldiers who are with prostitutes, with questions asked about the war and their current activities.

Lost in Paradise 
The 2011 film Lost in Paradise is a film that features two storylines; the main storyline focusing on gay male prostitution and the secondary storyline featuring a female prostitute. The film also includes violence against prostitutes for being gay. A Vancouver International Film Festival reviewer said that he felt the film's portrayal of gay prostitution was "authentic."

See also 

 Prostitutes in South Korea for the U.S. military
Prostitution in colonial India
History of prostitution in France

References

External links 
 Sex abuse and prostitution in Ho Chi Minh City, Vietnam – short documentary video on YouTube
 Candid Color Snapshots of Vietnamese Bar Girls During the Vietnam War

 
Society of Vietnam
Women in Vietnam
Vietnamese culture
Vietnam